Night Walker is a 1954 spy novel by Donald Hamilton. It was first serialized in Collier's Magazine in 1951 as Mask for Danger.

Plot summary
Navy Lt. David Young hitches a ride with a friendly stranger and wakes up in a hospital bed with a new name and a pretty young wife.

Hard Case Crime
Who was he, really, under the bandages?

When Navy Lieutenant David Young came to in a hospital bed, his face was covered with bandages and the nurses were calling him by a stranger’s name. But David’s nightmare was only beginning. Because the man they believed him to be was suspected of treason—and had driven his wife to murder.

Now David’s got to make his way through a shadow world of suspicion and deception, of dirty deals and brutal crimes, and he needs to stay one step ahead of enemies whose identity he doesn’t even know—since if he can’t, his impersonation of a dead man is about to become a lot more realistic... (1)

(1)http://www.hardcasecrime.com/books_bios.cgi?title=Night%20Walker

Publication history
1951, US, Collier's, as "Mask For Danger", 6/16/1951, 6/23/1951, 6/30/1951, 7/7/1951, 7/14/1951, serial (literature)
1954, US, Dell, Dell First Edition #27, paperback
1964, US, Fawcett Publications, Gold Medal k1472, paperback, reprinted several times
2006, US, Hard Case Crime #16, paperback

External links
Sample Chapter from Hard Case Crime
Review by Rod Lott, Bookgasm
Review by James Sallis, The Boston Globe

1954 American novels
American spy novels
Novels by Donald Hamilton
Dell Publishing books